The 2001 NC State Wolfpack football team represented North Carolina State University during the 2001 NCAA Division I-A football season. The team's head coach was Chuck Amato.  NC State has been a member of the Atlantic Coast Conference (ACC) since the league's inception in 1953.  The Wolfpack played its home games in 2001 at Carter–Finley Stadium in Raleigh, North Carolina, which has been NC State football's home stadium since 1966.

The originally scheduled home game on September 13, 2001 against Ohio was rescheduled to November 24, 2001 in the wake of the September 11 attacks.

Schedule

Roster

Game summaries

Indiana

SMU

North Carolina

Wake Forest

Clemson

Georgia Tech

Virginia

Duke

Florida State

Maryland

Ohio

Tangerine Bowl

References

NC State
NC State Wolfpack football seasons
NC State Wolfpack football